Aboubacar Fofana or Aboubakar Fofana may refer to:

 Aboubacar Fofana (Burkinabé footballer) (born 1984), Burkinabé goalkeeper that played in the under-17 FIFA World Cup tournament
 Aboubacar Fofana (French footballer) (born 1982), French footballer of Ivorian descent
 Aboubacar Fofana (footballer born 1996) (born 1994), French footballer currently playing for Saint-Brice U-17 Football Club
 Aboubacar Fofana (French futsal player) (born 1994), French futsal player, currently playing for Paris 15 Futsal Club
 Aboubacar Fofana (Guinean footballer) (born 1983), Guinean footballer
 Aboubacar Fofana (Malian artist) Malian artist and calligrapher
 Aboubacar Fofana Oury (born 1995), Gambian footballer
 Cheick Aïma Aboubacar Fofana, Ivorian President of the Higher Council of Imams (Cosim)
 Fofana Aboubacar (Guinean basketball player) (born 1984), Guinean basketball player, currently playing for Neptunas, Lithuania